is a Japanese television drama series from Fuji Television, first shown in Japan from 18 April to 27 June 2005.

Plot
Kanzaki Jiro (Takuya Kimura) (who used to be a star driver back in Japan) is a backup F3000 driver in Europe. During a practice run, he accidentally crashes into his first driver and loses his job. No other club in Europe would hire him as he is deemed too old for the sports. He has no choice but to return to Japan to his previous racing team. Unfortunately, the team now has a better and younger driver, and feels Jiro has nothing more to contribute to the team, and do not want him back.

He goes back to stay with his foster father and sister, and finds out his foster father has converted their home into an orphanage for unfortunate children whose parents are unable to take care of them. Tomomi Sensei (Koyuki), is a newly hired caregiver at the orphanage. She is not popular with the children as she does not seem to understand their feelings and makes misguided attempts to help them. Jiro, on the other hand, was an orphan himself, and being a big kid at heart is able to click with the children.

Despite the fact that Jiro hates children and is more interested in getting back into racing than helping out at the orphanage, he nonetheless agrees to be the orphanage's driver in exchange for being allowed to live there.

Cast
Takuya Kimura as Jiro Kanzaki (神崎 次郎)
Koyuki as Tomomi Mizukoshi (水越朋美)
Masato Sakai as Genichiro Torii (鳥居元一郎)
Yuki Matsushita as Chihiro Kanzaki (神崎ちひろ)
Yoshio Harada as Takeshi Kanzaki (神崎猛)
Shigeru Izumiya as Chinsaku Ichinose (一之瀬新作)
Aya Okamoto as Tamaki Suenaga (末永たまき)
Shinsuke Aoki as Hiroto Sugawara (菅原比呂人)

The Children of Kaze no Oka Home

 Ueno Juri as Hoshino Misae (星野美冴)
 Erika Toda as Hida Harumi
 Indou Kaho  as Ninomiya Yukie (二宮ユキエ)
 Houshi Ishida as Shioya Daisuke
 Natsumi Ohira as Taguchi Nao
 Daiki Arioka as Sonobe Toru
 Yuto Nakajima as Kusama Shuhei
 Kosugi Moichiro as Hirayama Morio
 Sato Miku as Sonobe Aoi
 Hirota Ryohei as Tone Akira
 Komuro Yuta as Kanemura Shunta
 Kitagawa Ayumi as Komori Nanae

Ratings 
In the tables below, the blue numbers represent the lowest ratings and the red numbers represent the highest ratings.

External links
JDorama entry
 

2005 Japanese television series debuts
2005 Japanese television series endings
Japanese drama television series
Fuji TV dramas
Television shows written by Yumiko Inoue